Ashland Township is a civil township of Newaygo County in the U.S. state of Michigan.  As of the 2000 census, the township population was 2,570. The city of Grant is adjacent to the township.  The township was established in 1854.

Communities
Dickinson was an unincorporated place in this township. It had a post office from 1888 until 1901.

Geography

Demographics
As of the census of 2000, there were 2,570 people, 839 households, and 665 families residing in the township. The racial makeup of the township was 93.50% White, 0.54% African American, 0.51% Native American, 0.23% Asian, 3.58% from other races, and 1.63% from two or more races. Hispanic or Latino of any race were 9.42% of the population.

There were 839 households, out of which 42.9% had children under the age of 18 living with them, 67.5% were married couples living together, 8.2% had a female householder with no husband present, and 20.7% were non-families. 16.3% of all households were made up of individuals, and 5.6% had someone living alone who was 65 years of age or older.  The average household size was 3.05 and the average family size was 3.42.

In the township the population was spread out, with 33.7% under the age of 18, 8.0% from 18 to 24, 31.0% from 25 to 44, 19.4% from 45 to 64, and 7.9% who were 65 years of age or older.  The median age was 32 years. For every 100 females, there were 100.9 males.  For every 100 females age 18 and over, there were 101.1 males.

The median income for a household in the township was $42,151, and the median income for a family was $46,098. Males had a median income of $36,369 versus $25,347 for females. The per capita income for the township was $18,232.  About 8.6% of families and 12.5% of the population were below the poverty line, including 16.5% of those under age 18 and 1.9% of those age 65 or over.

See also
 Grant Public School District

References

Notes

Sources

External links
Ashland Township 

Townships in Newaygo County, Michigan
Grand Rapids metropolitan area
1854 establishments in Michigan
Populated places established in 1854
Townships in Michigan